Bae Sin-yeong (born 11 June 1992) is a South Korean professional footballer who plays as a defensive midfielder for Indonesian club Persita Tangerang.

Career
He signed with K League 2 side Suwon in January 2015.
On 17 June 2021, Bae Shin-yeong moved to Persita Tangerang in the Indonesian Liga 1. On 17 September, He made his competitive debut by starting in a 0–1 win at Persela Lamongan.

References

External links 

1992 births
Living people
Association football midfielders
South Korean footballers
People from Gimcheon
Suwon FC players
Daegu FC players
Gimcheon Sangmu FC players
Bae Sin-yeong
Persita Tangerang players
K League 2 players
K League 1 players
Bae Sin-yeong
Liga 1 (Indonesia) players
South Korean expatriate footballers
Expatriate footballers in Thailand
Expatriate footballers in Indonesia
South Korean expatriate sportspeople in Thailand
South Korean expatriate sportspeople in Indonesia